Madavan-e Sofla (also Romanized as Mādavān-e Soflá and Mādovān-e Soflá; also known as Jowhavey, Mādavān-e Pā’īn, and Madovān Pā‘īn) is a village in Sarrud-e Shomali Rural District, in the Central District of Boyer-Ahmad County, Kohgiluyeh and Boyer-Ahmad Province, Iran. At the 2006 census, its population was 3,239, in 623 families.

References 

Populated places in Boyer-Ahmad County